Cass Township is one of four townships in Ohio County, Indiana, United States. As of the 2010 census, its population was 714 and it contained 303 housing units.

History
Cass Township was organized in 1845.

Geography

Unincorporated towns
 Aberdeen at 
 Bascom Corner at 
 Blue at 
 Cofield Corner at 
 Downey Corner at 
(This list is based on USGS data and may include former settlements.)

Cemeteries
The township contains Downey Cemetery.

Major highways
  Indiana State Road 56

School districts
 Rising Sun-Ohio County Community Schools

Political districts
 State House District 68
 State Senate District 43

References
 
 United States Census Bureau 2009 TIGER/Line Shapefiles
 IndianaMap

External links
 Indiana Township Association
 United Township Association of Indiana
 City-Data.com page for Cass Township

Townships in Ohio County, Indiana
Townships in Indiana